Hyde Park Congregational Church was a church in the Hyde Park section of Los Angeles.  The original wooden church with two front-corner towers was declared a Los Angeles Historic-Cultural Monument in 1963.  Despite the designation, the church was demolished in 1964.

See also
 List of Los Angeles Historic-Cultural Monuments in South Los Angeles

References

External links
 Big Orange Landmarks: Hyde Park Congregational Church — history and images.

Churches in Los Angeles
South Los Angeles
Churches completed in 1901
Los Angeles Historic-Cultural Monuments